Albert or Al Lucas may refer to:
* Al Lucas (American football) (1978–2005), professional American football player (NFL, AFL)
 Albert Lucas (athlete) (1899–1967), French hurdler
 Al Lucas (basketball) (1922–1995), professional basketball player who played one season for the Boston Celtics
 Al Lucas (musician) (1916–1983), Canadian jazz bassist and studio musician
 Albert Lucas (Jewish activist) (1859–1923), British-born American activist in global charity and Orthodox Judaism
 Albert Lucas (juggler) (born 1960), American juggler who has set several world records
 Albert Pike Lucas (1862–1945), American painter and sculptor